Mayotte has a Socialist Party and the Citizen and Republican Movement. 
Mayotte parties that took part in the elections for the General Council are:

Mahoré Departementalist Movement (Mouvement Départementaliste Mahorais)
Force of the Rally and the Alliance for Democracy (Force de Rassemblement et d'Alliance pour le Progrès)
Mahoré People's Movement (Mouvement populaire mahorais)

See also
 Politics of Mayotte
 List of political parties by country

 
Political parties
+Mayotte
Mayotte

Political parties